G'uzor Stadium is the main stadium of the hometown club FC Shurtan Guzar. It has been recently renovated.

References 

Sports venues built in the Soviet Union
Football venues in Uzbekistan
Athletics (track and field) venues in Uzbekistan
Sports venues in Uzbekistan
Multi-purpose stadiums in Uzbekistan